Edward Adamczyk (30 November 1921 – 7 April 1993) was a Polish athlete. He competed in the men's long jump and the men's decathlon at the 1948 Summer Olympics.

References

External links
 
 
 

1921 births
1993 deaths
Athletes (track and field) at the 1948 Summer Olympics
Polish male long jumpers
Polish decathletes
Olympic athletes of Poland
Sportspeople from Dortmund
Śląsk Wrocław athletes